Tochigi 2nd district (栃木県[第]2区, Tochigi-ken-[dai-]nikku) is a single-member constituency of the House of Representatives, the lower house of the national Diet of Japan. It is located in northeastern Tochigi and consists of the towns of Kanuma, Nikkō, Sakura, parts of cities of Utsunomiya and Tochigi and the entirety og Shioya District. As of 2016, 272,047 eligible voters were registered in the district.

The district is currently represented by former Governor of Tochigi Akio Fukuda. Previous representatives in the district include former Agriculture Minister Kōya Nishikawa and Justice Minister Mayumi Moriyama.

List of representatives

Election results

References 

Tochigi Prefecture
Districts of the House of Representatives (Japan)